Beris is a genus of flies in the family Stratiomyidae. They are small flies with reduced palpi. The scutellum has spines and the abdomen has seven visible segments. Their eyes are contiguous in the male.

Species
Beris alamaculata Yang & Nagatomi, 1992
Beris ancistra Cui, Li & Yang, 2010
Beris annulifera var. luteipes Johnson, 1926
Beris annulipes Brunetti, 1912
Beris basiflava Yang & Nagatomi, 1992
Beris burmanica Frey, 1960
Beris chalybata (Forster, 1771)
Beris clavipes (Linnaeus, 1767)
Beris concava Li, Zhang & Yang, 2009
Beris cypria James, 1970
Beris digitata Li, Zhang & Yang, 2009
Beris dolichocera Frey, 1960
Beris emeishana Yang & Nagatomi, 1992
Beris excellens Frey, 1960
Beris flava Li, Zhang & Yang, 2011
Beris furcata Cui, Li & Yang, 2010
Beris fuscipes Meigen, 1820
Beris gansuensis Yang & Nagatomi, 1992
Beris geniculata Curtis, 1830
Beris hauseri Stuke, 2004
Beris heptapotamica Pleske, 1926
Beris hildebrandtae Pleske, 1930
Beris hirotui Ôuchi, 1943
Beris huanglianshana Li, Zhang & Yang, 2009
Beris kovalevi Rozkošný & Nartshuk, 1980
Beris latifacies Nagatomi & Tanaka, 1972
Beris luteistigma Frey, 1960
Beris malaisei Frey, 1960
Beris miocenica James, 1937
Beris morrisii Dale, 1841
Beris nebulosa Nagatomi & Tanaka, 1972
Beris potanini Pleske, 1926
Beris pulchripennis Frey, 1960
Beris rozkosnyi Kassebeer, 1996
Beris schaposchnikowi Pleske, 1926
Beris shennongana Li, Luo & Yang, 2009
Beris spinosa Li, Zhang & Yang, 2009
Beris strobli Dušek & Rozkošný, 1968
Beris trilobata Li, Zhang & Yang, 2009
Beris vallata (Forster, 1771)
Beris yangxiana Cui, Li & Yang, 2010
Beris zhouae Qi, Zhang & Yang, 2011
Beris zhouquensis Li, Zhang & Yang, 2011
Beris ziminae Rozkošný & Nartshuk, 1980

References

Stratiomyidae
Brachycera genera
Taxa named by Pierre André Latreille
Diptera of North America
Diptera of Europe
Diptera of Asia